Korean Air flies to 12 domestic destinations and almost 150 international destinations in fifty countries on six continents (except seasonal charter), including destinations for cargo services.

Since the COVID-19 pandemic declared in January 2020, Korean Air has suspended most domestic and international routes. , Korean Air operates limited domestic and international routes.

List

References

External links 
Korean Air - Route Map
Korean Air - Flight Status

Lists of airline destinations
Korean Air
SkyTeam destinations